Frederick Darley, was an Irish architect, who designed and built a number of buildings in Dublin, including in Trinity College Dublin. He was also responsible for a number of civic and church buildings across Ireland. He was a son of the builder and architect Frederick Darley Senior, and his father served as Lord Mayor of Dublin in 1808–1809. His mother was Elizabeth (Guinness) Darley, eldest daughter of Arthur Guinness of Beaumont, Drumcondra.
In 1833–1843, Darley was the Ecclesiastical Commissioners architect for the Church of Ireland Diocese of Dublin.

Frederick Darley junior was a pupil of Francis Johnston. Darley himself was succeeded by his pupil John McCurdy as architect to Trinity College Dublin.

Darley was a founding member of the Royal Institute of the Architects of Ireland (RIAI) and lived on Lower Fitzwilliam Street, Dublin.

Buildings designed by Darley

 New Square, Trinity College Dublin.
 Carpenter's Asylum, 35 Seán McDermott Street (formerly Gloucester Street) (1832) 
 Merchants' Hall
 King's Inns Library, Henrietta Street, Dublin
 Trinity Church, Dublin, which became The Exchange, on Gardiner Street.
 Bethesda Chapel, Dublin, former Church of Ireland church on Dorset Street (1840 rebuild) (demolished).

References

1798 births
1872 deaths
Architects from Dublin (city)
19th-century Irish architects